Navia wurdackii is a plant species, in the genus Navia.

Habitat
This species is endemic to Venezuela.

References

wurdackii
Flora of Venezuela